= Tomasz Pauszek =

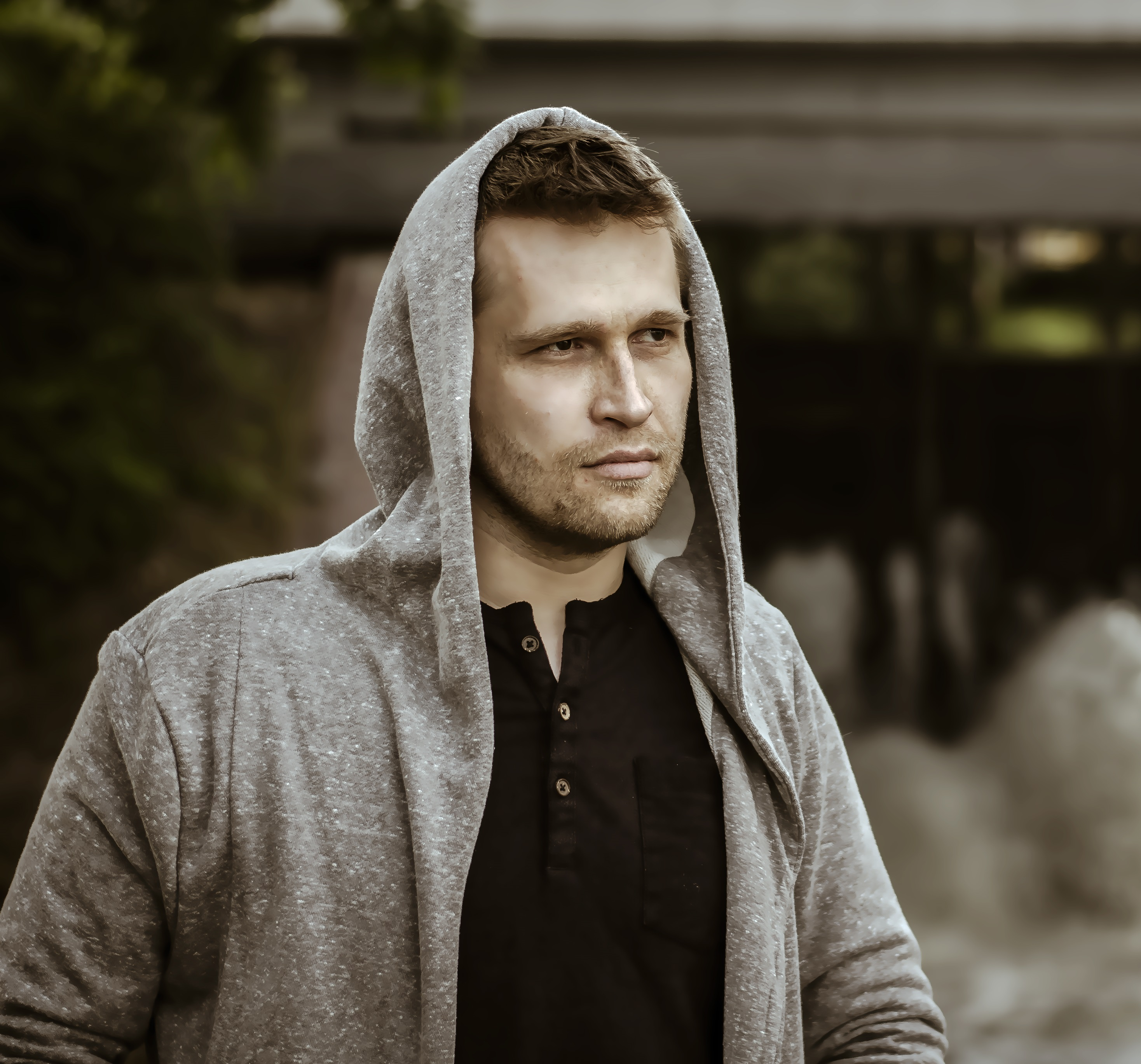

Background information
- Also known as: Odyssey, RND
- Born: 7 May 1978 (age 47); Bydgoszcz, Poland
- Genres: Electronic, ambient, experimental, chillout
- Instruments: Synthesizers, piano, keyboards
- Years active: 1999-present
- Labels: Generator, EtaLabel, WePlay! Records, Audio Anatomy
- Website: tomaszpauszek.com

Tomasz Paweł Pauszek (born 7 May 1978) is a Polish composer, conductor, producer, performer of electronic and instrumental music. He creates original compositions for his albums as well as music for television programs, music libraries, radio, online media and games.

== Education ==
Pauszek graduated from the Academy of Bydgoszcz (now known as Kazimierz the Great University in Bydgoszcz, Poland), with an Artistic Education degree in Music which allows him to be a conductor, thanks to his specialization.

== Artistic activity ==
Tomasz Pauszek started as a music producer in 1999. From 2000 to 2004 he was a co-organizer and a jury member of Synth Art Festival - The Festival of Electronic Music in Bydgoszcz.

From 2004 to 2011 he was a participant and a concert maker during Warsaw Electronic Festivals.

He is the author of original albums oscillating around electronics, chillout and film music in a broad sense. Throughout his career, he actively gives concerts, treating each performance as a separate, independent, personally invented and directed project, packed with lasers, lights and the latest multimedia.

== Discography ==
Project	Album	Year	Record label	Source
Tomasz Pauszek	Syntharsis	2001	Audio Anatomy	
Tomasz Pauszek & Remote Spaces	Ypsilon Project	2003	Audio Anatomy	
Tomasz Pauszek	5 Past Future	2006	Audio Anatomy	
Tomasz Pauszek	X-Space Odyssey	2009	Audio Anatomy	
Tomasz Pauszek	Music For Subway	2012	Audio Anatomy	
Tomasz Pauszek	The Four Elements	2014	Audio Anatomy	
Tomasz Pauszek	LO-FI LO-VE	2017	Audio Anatomy	
Przemysław Rudź & Tomasz Pauszek	Panta Rhei	2018	Audio Anatomy	
Tomasz Pauszek	20 Years Live	2019	Audio Anatomy	
Przemysław Rudź & Tomasz Pauszek & Wiktor Niedzicki	Panta Rhei II	2020	Audio Anatomy	
Tomasz Pauszek	LEM – The Tales From Beside	2023	BNB Records / Stalker Records	

== Cooperation with other artists ==
Since the very beginning of his artistic career he has cooperated with many other artists. Among the Polish artists there were: Józef Skrzek, Janusz Grzywacz, Wojciech Konikiewicz, Krzysztof Duda, Przemysław Rudź, Łukasz Pawlak (City Songs), Jakub Kmieć (Polaris, Scamall), Remote Spaces (Krzysztof Horn, Konrad Jakrzewski), Gushito, Pawbeats, Meeting By Chance, Dagiel, Konrad Kucz, Arkadiusz Reikowski, Grzegorz Bojanek, and Władysław Komendarek.

He also has cooperated with foreign artists such as: Dickson Dee, Thibault Cohade, and ISAN (Antony Ryan, Robin Saville).

== Awards ==
2004: 1st prize in a music competition organized during Warsaw Electronic Festival

2018: Big Red Button - award given by the "HighFidelity" magazine

2018: Best Recording 2018 - award for the best recorded album of 2018, given by the "HighFidelity" magazine

== Important concerts ==
- 2001: SYNTHARSIS LIVE TOUR – – the tour promoting ″Syntharsis″ album
- 2002: CYBERNETIC ECOLOGY (Bydgoszcz) – open-air concerts using the latest stage lighting techniques, lasers and pyrotechnics. The concerts were attended by dancers, actors from the Dar pantomime theater and members of the Knights' Brotherhood[51][52]
- 2004: EUROPA (Bydgoszcz, Stary Rynek) - concert on the occasion of Poland's accession to the European Union[53][54], using lights, lasers, pyrotechnics and large screens. The event was also attended by invited musicians, dancers and the Chamber Choir of the Academy of Music in Bydgoszcz, conducted by Janusz Stanecki.
- 2006: LIVE FROM ZACHĘTA (Warsaw, Zachęta National Gallery of Art) – a minimalist experimental concert presenting the synthesis of electroacoustic avant-garde music with new electronic sounds, promoting the album 5 Past Future[56]
- 2006: LIVE FROM MÓZG (Bydgoszcz, Klub Mózg) – concert promoting the album 5 Past Future[57]
- 2010: 2010 MICRO TOUR (Warsaw, Zachęta National Gallery of Art) – concert promoting the album X-Space Odyssey and science-fiction literature
- 2012: ALIVE @ ROBOFEST (Pruszcz Gdański, OKSiR) – concert dedicated to the memory of Czesław Niemen
- 2018: LO-FI LI-VE (Warsaw - Riviera-Remont Club, Cekcyn - CEMF Festival) – a series of concerts promoting the album LO-FI LO-VE
- 2019: 20 YEARS LIVE (Bydgoszcz - MCK, Straszyn - Toxin FM Radio, Grudziądz - Planetarium, Olsztyn - Planetarium, Warsaw - Heaven of Copernicus Planetarium) - The 20th anniversary of artistic work tour
- 2021: IN PERSON VIRTUAL (Gdańsk[84][85][86], Bydgoszcz[87][88][89], Nidzica[90][91][92], Bad Schandau (Germany)[93][94], Olsztyn[95][96][97][98][99]) - a concert tour on the occasion of the Year of Stanisław Lem and the 100th anniversary of the birth of this writer.

== Multimedia shows ==
- 2003: The Elements of Sport – the opening of Youth European Athletics Championships
- 2004: SPAR – The opening of European Cup in Athletics 2004
